Ghazi Ghrairi (born 27 August 1965) is a Tunisian football manager. He is the current manager of Sudanese club Al-Merrikh.

References

1965 births
Living people
Tunisian football managers
Al-Fayha FC managers
CS Sfaxien managers
Emirates Club managers
ES Zarzis managers
Stade Tunisien managers
Club Athlétique Bizertin managers
Al-Shaab CSC managers
ES Métlaoui managers
Tunisian Ligue Professionnelle 1 managers
Tunisian expatriate football managers
Expatriate football managers in Saudi Arabia
Tunisian expatriate sportspeople in Saudi Arabia
Expatriate football managers in the United Arab Emirates
Tunisian expatriate sportspeople in the United Arab Emirates
Saudi First Division League managers
UAE Pro League managers
Al-Merrikh SC managers
Expatriate football managers in Sudan
Tunisian expatriate sportspeople in Sudan